Events in the year 1978 in Turkey.

Parliament
 16th Parliament of Turkey

Incumbents
President – Fahri Korutürk
Prime Minister –
Süleyman Demirel (up to 5 January)
 Bülent Ecevit (from 5 January)
Leader of the opposition –
 Bülent Ecevit (up to 5 January)
Süleyman Demirel (from 5 January)

Ruling party and the main opposition
  Ruling party 
 Justice Party (AP) and coalition partners (up to 5 January)
 Republican People's Party (CHP) (from 5 January)

  Main opposition 
 Republican People's Party (CHP) (up to 5 January)
Justice Party (AP) (from 5 January)

Cabinet
41st government of Turkey (up to 5 January)  
42nd government of Turkey (from 5 January)

Events
 30 January – Student demonstrations in Ankara.
 17 March – Turkey criticizes Israeli invasion of Lebanon.
 7 April – Server Tanilli, an academic, survived a terrorist attack in Istanbul. 
 28 May – Fenerbahçe wins the championship.
 31 May – Meeting between Ecevit and U.S. president Jimmy Carter.
 1 June – Türkan Şoray, star in the film Selvi Boylum Al Yazmalım, wins Best Actress in Tashkent Film Festival.
 11 July – Bedrettin Cömert of Hacettepe University was killed in a terrorist attack.
 27 September – United States lifts embargo on aid to Turkey.
 11 December – Ahmet Enünlü wins gold in Mr. Universe bodybuilding competition.

Births
11 March – Hayko Cepkin, singer
11 May – Ece Erken TV hostess and actress
7 July – Yasemin Kozanoğlu, model
8 August -Ebru Yaşar,  singer
28 December – Özgü Namal, actress

Deaths
30 March – Memduh Tağmaç (aged 74), general and former chief of staff
24 March – Doğan Öz (assassinated at age 44), prosecutor
27 July – Ferit Alnar (aged 72), composer

Gallery

See also
List of Turkish films of 1978
Turkey in the Eurovision Song Contest 1978
1977–78 1.Lig

References

 
Years of the 20th century in Turkey
Turkey
Turkey
Turkey